The Oswald Watt Gold Medal is an Australian aviation award named for Oswald Watt (1878–1921), a decorated pilot in World War I.

It originated in 1921 after the death of Oswald Watt and is awarded for "A most brilliant performance in the air or the most notable contribution to aviation by an Australian or in Australia" by the Royal Federation of Aero Clubs of Australia. As it is awarded on merit it is not an annual award; between the award's creation and 1999 it had been awarded a total of 48 times. It was not awarded in the years 2000 - 2010.

Recipients
The recipients are:

1921 Francis Stewart Briggs – flew from Melbourne to Brisbane and from Melbourne to Perth
1922 Harry Turner Shaw – flew in a Farman Sport from Melbourne to Sydney and return in May 1922
1923 No award

1924 Flight Lieutenant Ivor McIntyre – pilot of a Royal Australian Air Force (RAAF) Fairey IIID configured as a floatplane in the first circumnavigation of Australia by air; departing from RAAF Point Cook, Victoria on 6 April 1924 and landing on St. Kilda Beach 44 days later
1925 E. J. Jones – flew from Melbourne to Normanton in north-west Queensland and back to Melbourne
1926 Flight Lieutenant Ivor McIntyre – second award; pilot on a flight with Wing Commander (later Air Marshal) Richard Williams from RAAF Point Cook (now RAAF Williams) near Melbourne to the Solomon Islands and return
1927 Bert Hinkler – flew non-stop from London to Latvia as part of a business trip
1928 Bert Hinkler – second award; flew from England to Australia
1929 Sir Charles Kingsford Smith 
1930 Sir Charles Kingsford Smith – second award
1931 Bert Hinkler – third award
1932 Bert Hinkler – fourth award
1933 Sir Charles Kingsford Smith – third award
1934 Sir Charles Kingsford Smith – fourth award
1935 Harry Frank (Jim) Broadbent
1936 Edgar Percival
1937 Dr. Clyde Fenton
1938 Don Bennett
1939-45 No awards
1946 Don Bennett – second award
1947 Squadron Leader Harold Brownlow Martin
1948-49 No awards
1950 Martin Warner – inadvertently set a British Empire altitude record for a glider of  after he flew a Slingsby T.25 Gull 4 into a cloud and it was caught in an updraft
1951 Patrick Gordon Taylor
1952 Squadron Leader P. G. Fisher
1953 Wing Commander Derek "Jell" Cuming
1954 Mervyn Waghorn
1955-56 No awards
1957 Sir Donald Anderson
1958 Squadron Leader D. W. Leckie
1959 A. E. Chadwick
1960 Brigadier Guy N. Moore
1961 No award
1962 Henry Millicer
1963 No award
1964 Edward Connellan – founder of  Connellan Airways in 1939
1965 No award
1966 Harry Schneider
1967 Sir Hudson Fysh – founder of Qantas in 1921
1968 No award
1969 George Alfred (Peter) Lloyd
1970-72 No awards
1973 Sir Norman Brearley – founder of West Australian Airways in 1921
1974 Sir Lawrence Wackett
1975 Sir Reg Ansett – founder of Ansett in 1935
1976 Clive Canning – flew a Thorp T-18 that he had built himself from Melbourne to London and return; his arrival in London on 1 July completed the first Australia-England flight in a homebuilt aircraft
 
 
1977 Horrie Miller – founder of MacRobertson Miller Airlines in 1927
1978 No award
1979 Bill Moyes
1980-82 No awards
1983 Dick Smith
1984-87 No awards
1988 Ian Honnery
1989-91 No awards
1992 Chris Dewhirst – the first person to fly a balloon over Mount Everest
1993 George "Scotty" Allan
1994 No award
1995 Jon Johanson – flew around the world in a Van's RV-4 two seat homebuilt aircraft that he had built himself, leaving Adelaide's Parafield Airport on 26 June 1995 and arriving back at Parafield on 4 September 1995
1996 Shirley Adkins
1997 Bernie Sarroff
1999 Paul D. Scully-Power
2000-2010 No awards
2011 Squadron Leader Paul Simmons
2012 John W. Dickenson – "for a most notable contribution to Aviation by an Australian for his invention of the modern Hang Glider and making improvements in flight safety"
2013 Marj Davis Gillespie – "her voluntary contribution of sixteen years to the Royal Federation of Aero Clubs of Australia, the Flying Training Industry and General Aviation"
2014 Air Chief Marshal Sir Angus Houston – awarded for his work as head of the Joint Agency Coordination Centre, set up to oversee the search for Malaysia Airlines Flight 370; and as Australia's Special Envoy to Ukraine after the crash in Ukraine of Malaysia Airlines Flight 17
2015 no award
2016 George Alfred (Peter) Lloyd – second award; "for continued and valuable service to the Aviation Industry and in particular the safety of aviation"
2017-2018 no awards

See also

 List of aviation awards

References

 AFC website list of Oswald Watts Gold Medal recipients retrieved 2007-08-21.
 
 Royal Federation of Aero Clubs of Australia

Aviation awards
Australian awards
Awards established in 1921